Vierville may refer to the following communes in France:

 Vierville-sur-Mer, location of Omaha Beach, a 1944 D-Day landing spot, in Normandy
 Vierville, Manche, also in Normandy
 Vierville, Eure-et-Loir

See also 

 Verville (disambiguation)